Umiken was a municipality in the district of Brugg in the canton of Aargau in Switzerland.  On 1 January 2010 the municipality of Umiken merged into Brugg.

Economy
 there was a total of 525 workers who lived in the municipality.  Of these, 472 or about 89.9% of the residents worked outside Umiken while 45 people commuted into the municipality for work.  There were a total of 98 jobs (of at least 6 hours per week) in the municipality.

References

Former municipalities of Aargau
Populated places disestablished in 2010